German-occupied Poland during World War II consisted of two major parts with different types of administration.

The Polish areas annexed by Nazi Germany following the invasion of Poland at the beginning of World War II—nearly a quarter of the entire territory of the Second Polish Republic—were placed directly under the German civil administration. The official term used by the Nazi authorities for these areas was the "incorporated Eastern territories". They planned for a complete Germanization of the annexed territories, considering them part of lebensraum.

The rest of Nazi-occupied Poland was renamed as the General Government district.

See also
Occupation of Poland (1939–1945)

References

Poland in World War II
Military history of Germany during World War II
World War II occupied territories
Germany–Poland relations
Germanization